Afroedura langi, also known as Lang's rock gecko, Lang's flat gecko, or Lowveld flat gecko, is a species of African gecko found in South Africa and Mozambique.

References

langi
Reptiles of Mozambique
Reptiles of South Africa
Taxa named by Vivian Frederick Maynard FitzSimons
Reptiles described in 1930